Hyalopoa is a genus of Asian plants in the grass family.

 Species
 Hyalopoa czirahica Hüseyin - Caucasus
 Hyalopoa hracziana Gabrieljan & Tzvelev - Caucasus
 Hyalopoa lakia (Woronow) Tzvelev - Caucasus
 Hyalopoa lanatiflora (Roshev.) Tzvelev - Siberia (Yakutia, Buryatia, Zabaykalsk)
 Hyalopoa nutans (Stapf) E.B.Alexeev ex T.A.Cope - Pakistan, Jammu-Kashmir, Tajikistan
 Hyalopoa pontica (Balansa) Tzvelev - Turkey, Caucasus

References

External links
 Grassbase - The World Online Grass Flora

Pooideae
Poaceae genera